Daba may refer to:

RAF El Daba, Daba, Egypt
Daba language, spoken in Cameroon and Nigeria
Daba (settlement), a Georgian equivalent of an urban-type settlement

China 
 Daba (religion), a native religion of the Mosuo people, an ethnic group in Yunnan and Sichuan Provinces in China
Daba Mountains, mountain range in Central China

Towns
Daba, Gansu (大坝), in Minqin County, Gansu
Daba, Heping County (大坝), in Heping County, Guangdong
Daba, Puning (大坝), in Puning, Guangdong
Daba, Yangjiang (大八), in Yangjiang, Guangdong
Daba, Guangxi (大坝), in Bobai County, Guangxi
Daba, Guizhou (大坝), in Renhuai, Guizhou
Daba, Liaoning (大巴), in Fuxin Mongol Autonomous County, Liaoning
Daba, Ningxia (大坝), in Qingtongxia, Ningxia

Townships
Daba Miao Ethnic Township (大坝苗族乡), in Xingwen County, Sichuan
Daba or Danbab Township (达巴乡), in Zanda County, Tibet
Daba Township, Zhaojue County (大坝乡), in Zhaojue County, Sichuan

Given name
Daba is a male given name of Ethiopian origin.

Tejitu Daba (born 1991), Ethiopian female long-distance runner competing for Bahrain
Bekana Daba (born 1988), Ethiopian long-distance runner
Demma Daba (born 1989), Ethiopian middle-distance runner
Maru Daba (born 1980), Ethiopian steeplechase runner

See also
Dabas (disambiguation)
Dibba, a region or city in the United Arab Emirates or Oman

Amharic-language names